Sigvaldi Guðjónsson (born 4 July 1994) is an Icelandic handball player for Kolstad Håndball and the Icelandic national team.

He participated at the 2019 World Men's Handball Championship.

References

External links

1994 births
Living people
Sigvaldi Gudjónsson
Sigvaldi Gudjónsson
Expatriate handball players
Sigvaldi Gudjónsson
Sigvaldi Gudjónsson
Sigvaldi Gudjónsson
Vive Kielce players
Kolstad Håndball players